Achyut Krishna Kharel was the chief of Nepal Police during the Maoist's Insurgency.

Kharel had been appointed Inspector General of Police (IGP) in 1997 A.D., but was then replaced by his successor, Dhruba Bahadur Pradhan, due to certain "political instabilities (Bam Dev Gautam)", before again becoming IGP. 
  
I.G.P. Kharel had initiated "Operation Kilo Cera II" during the Maoist's Insurgency, i.e. in the late 1990s.

Kharel had been the football captain of the Nepal Police Football Team in the late 1970s.

References

Living people
Year of birth missing (living people)
Nepalese police officers
Chiefs of police
Inspectors General of Police (Nepal)
People of the Nepalese Civil War
Khas people